René Jeanne was a French actor, writer, and cinema historian.  He was born in 1887 and died in 1969. Jeanne was married to actress Suzanne Bianchetti.
Jeanne was also notable for serving on the jury of the Mostra de Venise in 1937 and 1938.

Film Festival 
Jeanne and fellow film artist Émile Vuillermoz had the idea of an international film festival in France.  Its goal would be to compete with the Venice Film Festival, which had become politicised and was controlled at that time by Benito Mussolini. He passed the idea to Jean Zay, the French Minister of Public Instruction at the time.  Zay appreciated the idea, and therefore undertook the founding of the famous Festival de Cannes.

Filmography

As writer 
 1928 : Le Duel by Jacques de Baroncelli
 1928 : Lights of Paris by Pierre Hemp
 1932 : Imperial Violets by Henry Roussell
 1946 : Les 3 tambours by Maurice de Canonge
 1951 : Les Deux gamines by Maurice de Canonge

As actor 
 1927: Napoléon by Abel Gance: Jean-Charles Pichegru, a military instructor at Brienne College

Bibliography 
HISTOIRE DU CINEMA de 1895 à 1929 with Charles Ford

External links 
 

French male screenwriters
20th-century French screenwriters
French male silent film actors
20th-century French male actors
French film historians
1887 births
1969 deaths
French male non-fiction writers
20th-century French male writers